The "'NBKR Institute of Science and Technology"' ("'N.B.K.R.I.S.T.") is located in Vidyanagar, Kota, Tirupati Dist., Andhra Pradesh.

The institute offers B.Tech. programmes in Computer Science & Engineering, Electronics & Communication Engineering, Electrical & Electronics Engineering, Mechanical Engineering, Civil Engineering, Artificial Intelligence & Data Science and Information Technology. The institute has an R&D Cell and recognised research centres of JNT University Ananthpur offering Ph.D. programmes.

The institute is located on a 184-acre campus that is covered in beautiful greenery and has academic buildings, boys' and girls' hostels, an open-air auditorium, a sports facility, staff housing, and other amenities. Through student-run organizations and technical organizations, the Institute places a strong emphasis on the skill and career development of its alumni. In our Institute, there are professional chapters like IEEE, ISTE, IETE, and CSI.

Modern equipment is available at the department labs and computer centres to meet the demands of researchers, students, and instructors. There are plenty of books, periodicals, magazines, and newspapers in the main library. It has thousands of e-journal and e-book subscribers. The campus network can be used to access electronic resources.

It is possible for pupils to participate in co-curricular and extracurricular activities that will help them develop their overall skills. Students are exposed to practical learning experiences through industrial visits and pertinent field trips.

Contact Us 
Vidyanagar, Kota Mandal, Tirupati (D.T)-524413

Director:  Dr. V Vijaya Kumar Reddy

Phone No:89853 82247, 89851 59547, 9494902763

Website:www.nbkrist.org

https://www.nbkrist.co.in

Educational institutions established in 1979
1979 establishments in Andhra Pradesh
Universities and colleges in Nellore district